Hoath is a semi-rural village and civil parish in the City of Canterbury local government district.  The hamlets of Knaves Ash, Maypole, Ford, Old Tree, Shelvingford and Stoney Acre are included in the parish.

History
Hoath was part of the estate granted by King Ecgberht of Kent in 669 for the foundation of the church at Reculver, and remained part of that estate when King Eadred granted it to Archbishop Oda of Canterbury in 949. A chantry either in or connected with Hoath is recorded in the 14th century, with John Gardener as the chaplain, successor to Henry atte Were. On 9 December 1410 Archbishop Thomas Arundel dedicated a chapel to the Virgin Mary and consecrated a burial-ground at Hoath at the request of the inhabitants and his tenants there who, led by Sir Nicholas Haute, Peter Halle Esq. and Richard Hauk, then chaplain of the chantry, promised to observe his ordinances.

The hamlet of Ford was the location of Ford Palace, a residence of the Archbishops of Canterbury from at least the 14th century to the 17th. Robert Hunt, chaplain to the expedition that founded the first successful English colony in the New World, at Jamestown, Virginia in 1607, was born in Hoath in the late 1560s or early 1570s.

Amenities
Within Hoath there is a small primary school, a camp site called Southview Camping, a public house named the Prince of Wales, and a village hall.

A late medieval church, Holy Cross, stands on Church Road, and was originally a chapel-of-ease for St Mary's Church, Reculver. The building was renovated by Joseph Clarke between 1866 and 1867, when a north aisle was added.

References

Footnotes

Notes

Bibliography

External links

 www.hoath.org - village website with news, upcoming events and a history of the village

Villages in Kent
City of Canterbury
Civil parishes in Kent